Zachary Todd Kerin (born August 13, 1991) is an American football guard who is a free agent. He played college football at Toledo. He was signed by the Minnesota Vikings as an undrafted free agent in 2014.

Early years
Kerin attended Olentangy High School in Lewis Center, Ohio, where he was a first-team All-district and special mention All-state offensive lineman as a senior. On defense, he collected 55 tackles, five sacks, two forced fumbles and two fumble recoveries. He was selected to play in the North-South All-Star Game. He committed to play college football at Toledo on February 4, 2009.

College career
Kerin played college football at Toledo from 2009 to 2013, where he was selected to the All-MAC team three consecutive seasons in 2011 (1st team), 2012 (1st team) and 2013 (2nd team). He appeared in 50 career games, earning 38 career starts while not missing a single game over the final three years of his collegiate career. In 2013, he was a key part of the offense that ranked third in the MAC for total offense and fifth in scoring, anchoring an offensive line that only allowed five sacks during the 2013 campaign, which ranked first nationally.

Professional career

Pre-draft

Minnesota Vikings
Kerin was signed by the Minnesota Vikings as a rookie free agent following going undrafted in the 2014 NFL Draft.

In a Week 5 game against the Houston Texans on October 9, 2016, Kerin replaced Brandon Fusco at right guard after Fusco was knocked out of the game on the first series with a concussion. In Week 14, Kerin replaced Fusco again midway through the fourth quarter.

On September 2, 2017, Kerin was waived by the Vikings.

Detroit Lions
On September 3, 2017, Kerin was claimed off waivers by the Detroit Lions. He was placed on injured reserve on September 30, 2017 with a knee injury.

New York Giants
On July 12, 2018, Kerin signed with the New York Giants. He was released on September 1, 2018.

Atlanta Falcons
On September 18, 2018, Kerin signed with the Atlanta Falcons. He was released on October 23, 2018.

Washington Redskins
On December 4, 2018, Kerin signed with the Washington Redskins. He re-signed with the Redskins on March 18, 2019. He was waived on August 31, 2019.

New York Guardians
Kerin was drafted in the 5th round in phase two in the 2020 XFL Draft by the New York Guardians. He was placed on injured reserve during mini-camp in December 2019. He had his contract terminated when the league suspended operations on April 10, 2020.

Tennessee Titans
On April 29, 2020, Kerin was signed by the Tennessee Titans. He was released on July 26, 2020, and re-signed eight days later. He was released on September 5, 2020.

References

External links
Toledo Rockets bio

1991 births
Living people
People from Delaware, Ohio
Players of American football from Ohio
American football centers
Toledo Rockets football players
Minnesota Vikings players
Detroit Lions players
New York Giants players
Atlanta Falcons players
Washington Redskins players
New York Guardians players
Tennessee Titans players